Zabrat Stadium is a multi-use stadium in Zabrat, Azerbaijan.  It is currently used mostly for football matches and is the home stadium of Neftchi Baku PFC.  The stadium holds 3,000 people.

Football venues in Azerbaijan